Palei may refer to:

 Marina Anatolyevna Palei (née Spivak; born 1955), Russian-speaking Dutch writer
 Wapei–Palei languages, a branch of the Torricelli language family, spoken in Papua New Guinea 
 Palei-Aike Volc Field, an Argentine volcanic field near Chile

See also 
 Paley (disambiguation)